Neurodiversity Celebration Week is a worldwide initiative that challenges stereotypes and misconceptions about autism and learning disabilities. The initiative has two aims. The first is to encourage schools to recognise the strengths and talents of neurodivergent students who think and learn differently, including students who are autistic, dyslexic, dyspraxic, or who have ADHD. The second aim is to address the lack of training classroom teachers have in identifying and supporting their students with special educational needs by providing them with free resources. Neurodiversity Celebration Week is endorsed by over 20 charities and many organizations, including the UN Youth Envoy.

Over 1,400 schools and 685,000 students worldwide have signed up to participate in Neurodiversity Celebration Week through themed events, guest speakers and raising awareness. In addition, hundreds of businesses and organisations also take part, including The London Stock Exchange Group, The U.K. Ministry of Defence, Deloitte, Savills, and AstraZeneca. The U.K. Royal Navy created a video in which Second Sea Lord Vice Admiral Nick Hine discussed how being autistic has benefitted him in his naval career. The next Neurodiversity Celebration Week will be on March 13 - 19 2023.

History
Neurodiversity Celebration Week was started in 2018 by Siena Castellon when she was 16 year old. As an autistic student, who also has dyslexia, dyspraxia and ADHD, she experienced significant challenges, prejudice and bullying throughout her education. Her negative educational experiences motivated her to launch Neurodiversity Celebration Week in 2018 to challenge the misconceptions and stereotypes that still prevent autistic people and people with learning disabilities from reaching their potential.

Neurodiversity Celebration Week has featured on ITV News, a Carmen Sandiego series 'Fearless Kids Around the World', the BBC, The New Scientist, The Guardian, and Forbes. In 2020, Siena Castellon was selected out of over 7,000 global applicants by the United Nations to be a Young Leader for the Sustainable Development Goals (SDGs), a two-year role that allows her to promote her neurodiversity advocacy work and Neurodiversity Celebration Week.

Awards
Commonwealth Youth Awards 2021 Finalist
 The Big Issue Top 100 Changemakers 2021
 The International Children's Peace Prize Finalist
 Shaw Trust - 2020 Disability Power 100
 2020 Special Needs Jungle Awards – Person of the Year
 2019 European Diversity Awards – Campaigner of the Year

References

External links
 Neurodiversity Celebration Week

Autism activism
Neurodiversity
Disability observances
Health observances